In the field of computer security, Openswan  provides a complete IPsec implementation for Linux and FreeBSD.

Openswan, begun as a fork of the now-defunct FreeS/WAN project, continues to use the GNU General Public License. Unlike the FreeS/WAN project, it does not exclusively target the Linux operating system.

Libreswan forked from Openswan in 2012.

See also

 Libreswan
 strongSwan

External links

References

Virtual private networks
Software forks
Free security software
Cryptographic protocols
IPsec